
Gmina Krzyżanowice is a rural gmina (administrative district) in Racibórz County, Silesian Voivodeship, in southern Poland, on the Czech border.

Villages
Gmina Krzyżanowice contains the villages and settlements of Bieńkowice, Bolesław, Chałupki, Krzyżanowice, Nowa Wioska, Owsiszcze, Roszków, Rudyszwałd, Tworków and Zabełków.

Neighbouring gminas
Gmina Krzyżanowice is bordered by the town of Racibórz and by the gminas of Gorzyce, Krzanowice and Lubomia. It also borders the Czech Republic.

Gallery

References

Krzyzanowice
Racibórz County

de:Krzyżanowice#Gemeinde